Johnny C. Mathis (born July 14, 1943) is an American former basketball player. He played one season in the American Basketball Association (ABA).

Mathis played college basketball at Savannah State. Following the close of his college career, he played two seasons in Spain. He returned to the United States to play for the New Jersey Americans of the ABA for the 1967–68 season, averaging 3.4 points and 3.8 rebounds over 51 games. After finishing his career with the Allentown Jets of the Eastern League, he became a high school coach for John F. Kennedy High School in New York City, winning over 600 games in his career. He was inducted into the New York City Basketball Hall of Fame in 2015.

References

1943 births
Living people
Allentown Jets players
American expatriate basketball people in Spain
American men's basketball coaches
American men's basketball players
Basketball coaches from Georgia (U.S. state)
Basketball players from Georgia (U.S. state)
Hamden Bics players
High school basketball coaches in New York (state)
New Jersey Americans players
People from Eastman, Georgia
Power forwards (basketball)
Savannah State Tigers basketball players